Alfoz de Quintanadueñas is a municipality located in the province of Burgos, Castile and León, Spain. According to the 2004 census (INE), the municipality has a population of 1,300 inhabitants.

The Alfoz de Quintanadueñas is made up of five towns: Quintanadueñas (seat or capital), Arroyal, Marmellar de Arriba, Páramo del Arroyo and Villarmero.

References 

Municipalities in the Province of Burgos